The 1942 Lehigh Engineers football team was an American football team that represented Lehigh University during the 1942 college football season. In its first and only season under head coach George Hoban, the team compiled a 5–2–1 record, with one win and one tie against its Middle Three Conference rivals.  

The team played its home games at Taylor Stadium in Bethlehem, Pennsylvania.

Schedule

References

Lehigh
Lehigh Mountain Hawks football seasons
Lehigh Engineers football